August Klingler (24 February 1918 – 23 November 1944) was a German international footballer.

He scored six goals in only five matches for the German national team in the midst of the Second World War. He scored three goals in Germany's final international during World War II in November 1942, but was killed on the Eastern Front in 1944.

See also
 List of footballers killed during World War II

References

External links
 
 
 

1918 births
1944 deaths
Association football forwards
German footballers
Germany international footballers
German military personnel killed in World War II
German Army personnel of World War II